During the Russian invasion of Ukraine (2022-ongoing), Russian forces and organizations have stolen and looted tens of thousands of art pieces from Ukraine, ranging from modern art to ancient Scythian gold. The Russians have also destroyed hundreds of cultural sites and monuments. The looting has been organized, with, in some cases, Russian art experts participating in the theft, and directing Russian soldiers as to which pieces to steal. In Mariupol alone, Russians stole over 2,000 works of art from the city's three main museums, after Russian forces occupied the city after a three month siege in May 2022. In the Kherson region, shortly before fleeing the area to the north of the Dnieper river Russians destroyed, either fully or in part, over 200 Ukrainian cultural sites and stole around 10,000 art pieces from the city's museums, out of a collection of 13,000. Other sources put the number of stolen art works from Kherson alone at 15,000.

In occupied Melitopol, Russian troops stole a 4th century golden helmet dating to the Scythian kingdom, worth millions of dollars. Russian soldiers attempted to force the local museum director to reveal the location of other Scythian gold artifact which she had hidden shortly before Russian army occupied the city. They threatened her at gunpoint and abducted her when she refused to cooperate. She was interrogated and liberated. 

The looting by Russia has been compared to the Nazi plunder carried out by Nazi Germany and has been called "the single biggest collective art heist since the Nazis pillaged Europe in World War II".

See also
 2022 Russian theft of Ukrainian grain
 Art theft and looting during World War II
 Napoleonic looting of art
 Nazi plunder
 Sacking by Russian forces during the 2022 Russian invasion of Ukraine
 Ukrainian cultural heritage during the 2022 Russian invasion

References

External links
Saving the Artwork of Ukraine
'Like rape and the destruction of power plants, culture is another weapon of war for Russia'

2022 in Ukraine
Art crime
Looting in Europe
Museum crime
Russia–Ukraine relations